The Humber Pig is a lightly armoured truck used by the British Army from the 1950s until the early 1990s. The Pig saw service with the Royal Ulster Constabulary (RUC) chiefly as an armoured personnel carrier from late 1958 until early 1970. The Pig became particularly well known from its presence on the streets of Northern Ireland during the worst of the Troubles.

History

Officially designated Truck, Armoured, 1 Ton, 4x4, the Humber Pig is based on the FV1600 series of four wheel drive 1-ton payload trucks manufactured for the British Army by Rootes from 1952 to 1955. The Pig FV1611 is the armoured variant of FV1601 CT Truck and the FV1612 the armoured version of the FV1602 CT FFW Truck. As FV1609 an armoured version was originally designed to fulfil many roles with Royal Armoured Corps, Royal Artillery, Royal Engineers, RS, REME and infantry. The full armoured body was fitted to fulfil the need for an armoured personnel carrier until the  Alvis Saracen could be delivered in numbers. The armoured bodies were produced by J.Sankey as well as the Royal Ordnance Factories.  Of 3,700 Humber trucks some 1,700 Pigs were produced.

Deployment
Twenty prototype Pigs FV1609A (no armoured rear roof) entered troop trials in 1956. When these trials ended ten were issued to the RUC in October 1958. In 1960 the RUC Pigs were upgraded with a rear roof to emulate the FV1611 that was then in production. The truck chassis proved ideal for urban internal security duties, and ended up serving longer than the larger, heavier Saracens that were intended to replace them.

As the Troubles in Northern Ireland escalated during the 1970s, some 487 Army Pigs were further modified with additional internal and external armour during the period of September 1972 to July 1973. These were referred to as Mark II vehicles. The last of the Mark II Pigs were removed from service in the early 1990s.

Variants

Official designations
FV1601, FV1602 — un-armored Cargo GS and FFW (fitted for wireless) Humber CT trucks.
FV1609 — c1956 Prototype APC vehicle with removable rear roof, canvas roof, and removable windscreens.
Mk 1 FV1611 and FV1612 plus FV1609 vehicles converted to Mk 1 Pig spec with fully integrated rear roof and armour. Side storage boxes in Northern Ireland to prevent terrorists from placing explosives.
FV1620 — Humber Hornet, a dedicated converted FV1611 to Malkara missile-launching platform.
Mk 2 FV1611 and FV1612 —Additional armour for protection against small-arms fire and rocket propelled grenades, "barricade removers" (heavy-duty bull bars) which enabled them to force their way through barricades erected in the streets.

Unofficial designations
Some vehicles were equipped with the machine gun turret from the Shorland ISPV. All below were developed for use in Northern Ireland:
Flying Pig — FV1611 with extending riot screens either side and roof.
Holy Pig — fitted with rooftop hatch surrounded by perspex screen (reference to the Popemobile)
Kremlin Pig — fitted with wire screening for protection against rocket propelled grenades (RPG-7)
Squirt Pig — fitted with a water cannon beside driver for riot control.
Foaming Pig — fitted with a foam generator to diffuse bomb blasts.
Felix Pig — modified for bomb disposal duties.
Turret Pig — Has the machine gun from the Shortland armored vehicle installed for operation in the Armagh area.

Gallery

See also 
Land Rover Tangi
List of armoured fighting vehicles

References

External links

Humber Pig pictures
Humber "Pig" 1-Ton Armored Personnel Carrier/ Internal Security Vehicle

Cold War armoured fighting vehicles of the United Kingdom
Military vehicles introduced in the 1950s
Armoured personnel carriers of the United Kingdom
Armoured personnel carriers of the Cold War
Wheeled armoured personnel carriers